Vera Sergeyevna Kashcheyeva (15 September 1922 – 20 May 1975) was a medic in the 120th Rifle Regiment who was awarded the title Hero of the Soviet Union in 1944 for her actions in the Dnieper crossing.

Early life 
Kashcheyeva was born on 15 September 1922 to a Russian peasant family in the Petrovka, located within the present-day Altai Krai. After graduating from her seventh grade of school in her hometown she moved to the city of Barnaul, where she initially worked at a kindergarten before becoming a nurse at a textile plant in January 1940.

She became a member of the Communist Party of the Soviet Union in 1944.

World War II 
Initially after the German invasion of the Soviet Union, Kashcheeva remained in nursing courses until graduating in November 1941. She then repeatedly requested to be sent to the warfront, and was accepted into the Red Army in March 1942 to serve as a medic in the newly-formed 315th Rifle Division, composed of people from the Altai region. Upon completing training in August she was deployed to the warfront as part of the 362nd Rifle Regiment, but remained there only briefly before transferring to the 115th Separate Rifle Brigade before eventually settling with the 120th Guards Rifle Regiment in October. There she received her "baptism by fire" in the Battle of Stalingrad. Later during defensive operations at the Krasny Oktyabr Steel Plant, the regiment fought off as many as twenty attacks daily and downed multiple enemy aircraft and artillery points, at the price of significant casualties. Throughout constant aerial bombardment and poor weather conditions she treated wounded soldiers, as well as helping spot German snipers and deliver food.

In a mission that involved landing in Dnipropetrovsk and crossing the Dnieper river, the unit managed to provide a foothold for later troops to come. Despite incurring severe injuries and nearly bleeding to death she continued her work in reconnaissance, delivering information on enemy artillery positions to her commanding officers, which helped troops regain control of a strategic bridgehead on the right bank of the river. Only five soldiers from the initial landing group survived the fighting, including her. For her actions on that mission, she was awarded the title Hero of the Soviet Union on 22 February 1944, wherein she was praised not only for completing her mission through hardships but also inspiring other soldiers to continue on fighting.

Later life 
In 1944 she was demobilized from the front lines for health reasons and returned to the city of Barnaul where she graduated from medical school as a midwife in 1948 and worked as a nurse there until she got married. After getting married she and her husband moved to the Far Eastern part of Russia in Khabarovsk, where they lived until 1973. Until 1953 she was in charge of a nursery school in Bira, Jewish Autonomous Oblast. In 1973 the family moved to Apsheronsk where she worked as a paramedic and was awarded the Florence Nightingale Medal by the Red Cross.

On 20 May 1975, Kashcheyeva died in an automobile accident with her grandson and was buried in the Apsheronsk cemetery. Streets in Barnaul, Bira, and Apsheronsk bear her name.

Awards 
 Hero of the Soviet Union (22 February 1944)
 Order of Lenin (22 February 1944)
 Order of the Red Star (30 August 1943)
Medal "For Courage" (12 August 1943)
Medal "For Battle Merit" (22 January 1944)
 Florence Nightingale Medal (12 May 1973)
 campaign and jubilee medals

See also 

 List of female Heroes of the Soviet Union
 39th Guards Rifle Division
 Battle of Stalingrad

References

Bibliography
 
 

1922 births
1975 deaths
Heroes of the Soviet Union
Women in the Russian and Soviet military
Recipients of the Order of Lenin
Soviet women in World War II
Recipients of the Medal "For Courage" (Russia)
Florence Nightingale Medal recipients